Krek is the fourth studio album by Norwegian black metal band Khold. It was released on 18 October 2005, through Tabu Recordings.

Track listing

"Krek" - 2:08
"Blod Og Blek" - 3:05
"Innestengt I Eikekiste" - 3:22
"Oskorei" - 3:46
"Byrde" - 3:37
"Lysets Flukt" - 3:45
"Grepet Om Kniven" - 3:03
"Midvinterblot" - 3:52
"Varde" - 3:07
"Silur Wie" - 4:15

References 

2005 albums
Khold albums